The Guest is a 2014 Chilean drama film written and directed by Mauricio López Fernández. The worldwide premiere was in October 2014 in competition at the Valdivia International Film Festival and later, in 2015, it was presented at the Guadalajara International Film Festival, Outfest, CinéLatino Toulouse and, also in France, at the Rencontres du Cinéma Sud-Américain, Marseille, when it won the First Prize for Best Film and Best Actress for Daniela Vega in her film debut.

Plot
In an old house on the outskirts of Santiago, a wake is being held for Coya's husband. Coya is the maid who has served the family for many years and is considered a part of it. The family is waiting for Felipe, Coya's only son, to arrive. However, they are surprised to discover that Felipe has transitioned and now goes by the name Elena, a trans woman. This unexpected revelation becomes more important than the wake itself and completely upsets the conservative family, unleashing conflicts and frustrations that even reach Tete, the owner of the house, who is also suffering due to her husband's infidelity.

Cast
 Daniela Vega, as Elena 
 Claudia Cantero, as "Tete"
 Rosa Ramírez, as Coya
 Paulo Brunetti, as Enrique
 Carmen Barros, as the grandma

References

2014 films
2014 drama films
Chilean drama films
2010s Spanish-language films
Chilean LGBT-related films
LGBT-related drama films
2014 LGBT-related films
Films about trans women
2010s Chilean films